Tschugguel (also written as Tschuggül) is an Austrian noble family from South Tyrol. The family was granted the right to bear a coat of arms in 1530 and was elevated to the rank of baron in 1705, becoming von Tschugguel zu Tramin.

History 
The Tschugguel family originated near the Ulten Valley on Tschueggsee in South Tyrol. The name, meaning "oak at Tschueggsee", comes from an Austrian legend about a thousand-year-old oak tree. Members of the family settled in Kaltern an der Weinstraße and Tramin an der Weinstraße in the 13th century.

In 1530 the mayor of Tramin an der Weinstraße, Leonhard von Tschugguel, was awarded a coat of arms by Archduke Ferdinand.

On 23 May 1705 Leonhard Ritter von Tschugguel Edler von Tschuegg von Pichelheimb, Graunburg und Mayenfeldt was elevated from knightly rank to baronial rank in the Austrian nobility.

Notable family members 
 Baron Albert von Tschugguel, Austrian Court Councilor and deputy imperial postmaster
 Peter von Tramin (Peter Tschugguel), Austrian writer
 Alexander Tschugguel, Austrian Catholic activist

References 

Austrian noble families
German-language surnames
Noble families of the Holy Roman Empire